Ronald Lee Fleming, F.A.I.C.P., is the founder and president of The Townscape Institute, a not-for-profit public interest planning organization founded in the United States in 1979.  He is a fellow of the American Institute of Certified Planners.

He  attended Pomona College and the Harvard Graduate School of Design. In 2006, he received the William H. Whyte Lifetime Achievement Award from Partners for Livable Communities in Washington, D.C.  He also won several awards for his 1998 Radnor Gateways Enhancement Strategy in Radnor, Pennsylvania.

He has written several books on the urban landscape covering preservation, corporate visual responsibility and placemaking, most recently The Art of Placemaking: Interpreting Community Through Public Art and Urban Design.  According to WorldCat, the book is held in 335 libraries   He was instrumental in the early Main Street Revitalization movement of the 1970s.

He resides in Cambridge, Massachusetts and Newport, Rhode Island, at Bellevue House. Additionally, he is one of the Directors and Officers of Fathers & Families, a fathers' rights organization.

Publications
Fleming, Ronald Lee. The Art of Placemaking: Interpreting Community Through Public Art and Urban Design. London: Merrell, 2007. 
Fleming, Ronald Lee, Rachel Goldsmith, and J. A. Chewning. Saving Face: How Corporate Franchise Design Can Respect Community Identity. Chicago, IL: American Planning Association, Planning Advisory Service, 1994. OCLC 30925448
Fleming, Ronald Lee, and Renata von Tscharner. Place Makers: Creating Public Art That Tells You Where You Are : with an Essay on Planning and Policy. Boston: Harcourt Brace Jovanovich, 1987. 
Fleming, Ronald Lee. Facade Stories: Changing Faces of Main Street : Storefronts and How to Care for Them. Cambridge, MA: Townscape Institute, 1982. 
Fleming, Ronald Lee, Renata von Tscharner, and George Melrod. Place Makers: Public Art That Tells You Where You Are. Cambridge, MA.: Townscape Institute, 1981. OCLC 30925448

Notes

External links 
 Homepage of The Townscape Institute
 Fellows of the American Institute of Certified Planners
 The Art of Placemaking Official Publisher's Site

American urban planners
Year of birth missing (living people)
Harvard Graduate School of Design alumni
Living people
Fathers' rights activists
Pomona College alumni